The Hollandse (or Hollandsche) IJssel ("Holland IJssel", as opposed to the 'regular' or Gelderland IJssel) is a branch of the Rhine delta that flows westward from  Nieuwegein on river Lek through IJsselstein, Gouda and Capelle aan den IJssel to Krimpen aan den IJssel, where it ends in the Nieuwe Maas. Another branch called Enge IJssel ("Narrow IJssel") flows southwest from Nieuwegein. The name IJssel is thought to derive from the Germanic i sala, meaning "dark water". Originally, the Hollandse IJssel forked off from river Lek at Nieuwegein, but the connection was cut off with the Hollandse IJssel nowadays only draining the surrounding pastures.

If the North Sea floods, the Hollandse IJssel allows water through the Rotterdam Waterway to flood low-lying land east of Rotterdam. The Delta Works included a steel barrier that can be lowered within minutes to block the waterway. The sea protection constructions were built at the mouth of the Hollandse IJssel in 1957.

See also
 IJssel

References

Rivers of South Holland
Rivers of Utrecht (province)
Rivers of the Rhine–Meuse–Scheldt delta
Rivers of the Netherlands